The Red Badge of Courage is a 1974 American TV movie based on the 1895 novel The Red Badge of Courage by Stephen Crane.

Cast
 Richard Thomas as Henry Fleming
 Michael Brandon as Jim Conklin
 Wendell Burton as Wilson
 Charles Aidman as Tattered Man
 Warren Berlinger as Cheery Soldier
 Lee de Broux as Sergeant

References

External links
 The Red Badge of Courage at TCMDB
 

1974 television films
1974 films
Films based on American novels
Films scored by Jack Elliott
NBC network original films
Films directed by Lee Philips